Pecou, French spelling Pécou, is a French surname. Notable people with the surname include:

 Fahamu Pecou (born 1975), American visual artist and scholar
 Thierry Pécou (born 1965), French composer

Surnames of French origin